Larry Dean Kelm (November 29, 1964 – November 22, 2014) was a professional American football player from Corpus Christi, Texas, who played linebacker for seven seasons for the Los Angeles Rams and the San Francisco 49ers.

Death 

Hiding alone to kill deer on November 22, 2014, he fell from a Laredo, Texas, windmill and died. R.C. Slocum, Kelm's coach while at Texas A&M was "heartbroken" by the news.

He died one week before his 50th birthday.

References

1964 births
2014 deaths
Sportspeople from Corpus Christi, Texas
Players of American football from Texas
American football linebackers
Texas A&M Aggies football players
Los Angeles Rams players
San Francisco 49ers players
Accidental deaths in Texas
Accidental deaths from falls